Little Anegada is an island of the British Virgin Islands in the Caribbean.

Islands of the British Virgin Islands